Krasnomayskaya is a rural locality (a village) in Pochepsky District, Bryansk Oblast, Russia. The population was 13 as of 2010. There is 1 street.

Geography 
Krasnomayskaya is located 25 km east of Pochep (the district's administrative centre) by road. Moskali is the nearest rural locality.

References 

Rural localities in Pochepsky District